The Oman men's national field hockey team represents Oman in men's international field hockey competitions.

Tournament record
Oman has never qualified for the World Cup or the Summer Olympics. In the continental cups, they have reached the seventh place at the Asian Games four times and they became sixth once at the Asia Cup.

Asian Games

Asia Cup

AHF Cup

Asian Champions Trophy

AHF Central Asia Cup

West Asian Cup

Hockey World League

*Draws include matches decided on a penalty shoot-out.

References

External links
FIH profile

Asian men's national field hockey teams
Field hockey
Men's sport in Oman
National team